is a train station in Iida,  Nagano Prefecture, Japan, operated by Central Japan Railway Company (JR Central).

Lines
Kawaji Station is served by the Iida Line and is 117.5 kilometers from the starting point of the line at Toyohashi Station.

Station layout
The station consists of a single ground-level side platform serving one bi-directional track. The station is unattended.

Adjacent stations

History
It was renamed to its present name on 1 August 1943 when the Ina Electric Railway was nationalized. With the privatization of Japanese National Railways (JNR) on 1 April 1987, the station came under the control of JR Central. A new station building was completed in May 2001.

Passenger statistics
In fiscal 2015, the station was used by an average of 113 passengers daily (boarding passengers only).

Surrounding area
Tenryū River

See also
 List of railway stations in Japan

References

External links

 Kawaji Station information 

Railway stations in Nagano Prefecture
Railway stations in Japan opened in 1927
Stations of Central Japan Railway Company
Iida Line
Iida, Nagano